Holmium acetate is the acetate salt of holmium, with a chemical formula of Ho(CH3COO)3.

Preparation
Holmium acetate can be obtained by dissolving holmium carbonate in acetic acid: 
 Ho2(CO3)3 + 6 CH3COOH → 2 (CH3COO)3Ho + 3 H2O + 3 CO2↑

Dissolving holmium oxide in acetic acid at a pH of 4 will form the tetrahydrate of holmium acetate (Ho2(CH3COO)6·4H2O):
 Ho2O3 + 6 CH3COOH → 2 Ho(CH3COO)3 + 3 H2O

Physical properties
Holmium acetate's hemihepthydate decomposes at 105 °C, forming into a hemihydrate, further decomposing at 135 °C into an anhydride. Further adding heat will form Ho(OH)(CH3COO)2, HoO(CH3COO) then Ho2O2CO3, forming holmium oxide at 590 °C.

Applications
Holmium acetate is used in the manufacture of ceramics, glass, phosphors, metal halide lamps, and as a dopant in garnet lasers. It is also used in nuclear reactors to keep the chain reaction in check.

References

External reading

Holmium compounds
Acetates